The 1897 Rhode Island gubernatorial election was held on April 7, 1897. Republican nominee Elisha Dyer Jr. defeated Democratic nominee Daniel T. Church with 58.11% of the vote.

General election

Candidates
Major party candidates
Elisha Dyer Jr., Republican
Daniel T. Church, Democratic

Other candidates
Thomas H. Peabody, Prohibition
Franklin E. Burton, Socialist Labor
John H. Larry, National Liberty

Results

References

1897
Rhode Island
1897 Rhode Island elections